Volkovce is a village and municipality in Zlaté Moravce District of the Nitra Region, in western-central Slovakia.

The village has recently launched a new website, www.volkovce.sk

Village symbols 
Coat of arms:

A blue shield as background has a silver mouldboard with coulter hovers over sickle lying horizontally. Between the mouldboard and the coulter are two golden pilgrimage sticks crossed through a silver shell.

The Flag:

The Volkovce flag consists of four horizontal stripes – white, blue, yellow
and blue. The ratio of the sides of the flag is 2:3 and the right hand side has a jagged edge. The colours of the stripes correspond to the 
colours of the Volkovce's crest.

The
first written mention of Volkovce dates back to 1275, calling it Wolkouch, later Walkoch (in 1327) and in 1773 Wolkowcze. The Hungarian 
name for Volkovce is Valkóc.

History 

The earliest evidence of settlement in the area dates back to the Palaeolithic period, around 35,000 years ago. The first written mention of Volkovce is found in a document from 1275, where the village is mentioned as being a part of the Tekov Castle. In 1327 part of the village belonged to the Saint Benedict Abbey. In 1535 the village was burnt completely. In 1565 the village was one of Esztergom canonry. In the 16th and 17th centuries this area fell victim to Turkish invasion. The Závada village is first mentioned in 1629. The villages of Volkovce and Závada first merged in  1924-1931, and finally in 1945. Part of the village also includes the village (former farmlands) Slance and Olichov.

1275 

The first written reference to Volkovce is found in a document from 1275. It was written by master Ladislav an official from Ostrihom canonry during the reign of king Ladislav IV. The document confirms the exchange of land estates between master  Štefan, the Tekov region  Zhupan (Zhupan = a title of various positions among South Slavic peoples, at the head of several types of units called ŽUPA) and the castle's lords Dom, the son of George and his brothers. All the attending parties declared that they “give and assign estates called Mohala and Wolkouch”, that have fallen into the castle's territory and therefore  are  better, preferable and more beneficial to be exchanged for other estates that belong to them”.

Volkovce did not get into this document as a newly erected village, but in connection with an economic dispute of its residing owners.  It can be assumed that the village was probably well established and  belonged under the territory of  Tekov castle.

1327
Another interesting reference to Volkovce is dated 1327. It is also a record about judicial  dispute between an Abbot of Saint Benedict Abbacy, who owned a part of estate in the region of Volkovce and Pavol also named as Literate from Volkovce and his brothers. According to the document these tenants wanted to withdraw from the influence of the abbot and claim ownership of the land they had rented from him. However, the abbot was able to prove that the predecessors of Pavol acquired their lands from the previous abbot as tenants, therefore the estates in dispute continued to be the property of abbacy. Since Pavol lost his case, he was forced to pay the court costs – 12 marks of silver

read more about the history of  Volkovce on its website www.volkovce.sk

Geography
The municipality lies at an altitude of 210 metres and covers an area of 11.604 km². In 2011 it had a population of 1005 inhabitants.

Volkovce lies in the Danube highlands, represented by Hron highlands on 
the southern slopes of Pohronský Inovec in the Valley of the Bočovka Stream.

Basic information 
Cultural and historical values
A Roman Catholic church of St. Jacob the Elder,
is situated in the centre of the village. The original building was 
built in the Gothic style. However it was rebuilt in the Baroque style 
between 1750-1754. A church tower was built into the front of the 
building in 1926. The church building is the oldest historical building 
in the village with the presbytery dating back to the 14th century.
 Other sacral monuments – several historical crosses and Virgin Mary statues commissioned by individual families as a thanksgiving for the Lord's help and protection.
 A memorial board for the 1st and 2nd WW victims
 Private properties dated back to 19th century, these are mostly renovated as summer-houses or chalets.
 The folk group Volkovčanka
 Local church choir
 Amateur theatre group

References

External links
Official homepage

Villages and municipalities in Zlaté Moravce District